Kais is a Papuan language of the Bird's Head Peninsula of Kais District, South Sorong Regency, West Papua.

References

Nuclear South Bird's Head languages